Jane Dewar Schaberg (1938–2012) was an American biblical scholar who served as Professor of Religious Studies and of Women's Studies at the University of Detroit Mercy from 1977 through 2009.

Life 
Born in 1938, Schaberg earned a BA in philosophy from Manhattanville College, an MA in systematic theology from Columbia University, and a PhD in biblical studies from Union Theological Seminary. In 1974 she was elected a member of the Catholic Biblical Association.

Schaberg's publications deal mainly with the New Testament, including a commentary on the New Testament Infancy Narratives, on the Gospel of Luke, and on feminist contributions to historical and literary research. She also wrote poetry although her poetry is not widely published. Her later research was on the traditions and legends associated with the figure of Mary Magdalene, as seen through a feminist lens. Schaberg's sometimes controversial work, especially the 1987 publication of The Illegitimacy of Jesus: A Feminist Theological Interpretation of the Infancy Narratives, has been discussed in Newsweek, Time, The New Yorker, Cross Currents, and the Detroit Free Press. Schaberg's automobile was set on fire in response to this book.

At one time a professed member of the Society of the Sacred Heart of Jesus (a religious community of Roman Catholic women), Schaberg renounced her vows while teaching at the University of Detroit Mercy, and in 1984 was one of 97 theologians and religious persons who signed A Catholic Statement on Pluralism and Abortion, calling for religious pluralism and discussion within the Catholic Church regarding the church's position on abortion.

She was chosen for the Distinguished Faculty Award in 2006, she was acknowledged as Professor Emerita of Religious Studies in 2011 following her retirement.
She died at her home in Detroit April 17, 2012, at the age of 74 after a long illness.

Works

Thesis

Books
  - general publication of the author's 1980 thesis

Edited by

References

External links
 An interview with Jane D. Schaberg - feminist biblical scholar

American biblical scholars
Roman Catholic biblical scholars
New Testament scholars
Historians of antiquity
American feminist writers
American theologians
American historians of religion
Women's historians
University of Detroit Mercy faculty
Manhattanville College alumni
Union Theological Seminary (New York City) alumni
Feminist historians
Feminist studies scholars
Christian feminist theologians
1938 births
2012 deaths
American women historians
Catholic feminists
Female biblical scholars
Christian feminist biblical scholars
20th-century Christian biblical scholars
21st-century American women